This is a list of journalists killed in Honduras.

1983
 Dial Torgerson, American war correspondent of Los Angeles Times - 21 June 1983 in Trojes, El Paraíso.

2001
 Aristides Soto, Televicentro sports commentator - 5 October 2001 in San Pedro Sula.

2003
 Germán Antonio Rivas, Mayavisión Canal 7 news anchor - 26 November 2003 in Santa Rosa de Copán

2007
 Carlos Salgado, Radio Cadena Voces, Host - 18 October 2007 in Tegucigalpa (capital), Francisco Morazán

2009
 Rafael Munguia, Radio Cadena Voces reporter - 1 April 2009 in San Pedro Sula
 Gabriel Fino Noriega, Estelar Radio - 3 July 2009 in San Juan Pueblo
 Bernardo Rivera Paz - kidnapped on 14 March 2009 in San Pedro Sula and founded dead on 9 July in Florida, Copán.

2010
 Nicolás Asfura - 17 February 2010
 Joseph Hernández Ochoa, TV Channel 51, TV host - 1 March 2010 in Tegucigalpa (capital), Francisco Morazán
 David Meza Montesinos, TV Channel 45, Radio El Patio, Radio America - 11 March 2010 in La Ceiba, Atlántida
 Nahúm Elí Palacios Arteaga, TV Channel 5, television presenter - 14 March 2010 in Tocoa, Colón
 José Bayardo Mairena Ramírez, Excélsior and Manuel de Jesús Juárez, Radio Super 10–26 March 2010 in Juticalpa, Olancho
 Luis Antonio Chavez - 13 April 2010
 Jorge Alberto (Georgino) Orellana, Televisión de Honduras, TV host - 20 April 2010 in San Pedro Sula, Cortés
 Carlos Salinas - 8 May 2010
 Luis Arturo Mondragón, Channel 19, owner and TV presenter - 14 June 2010 in El Paraíso, El Paraíso
 Israel Zelaya Díaz, Radio Internacional - 24 August 2010 in San Pedro Sula, Cortés
 Henry Suazo, Radio HRN, Cablevisión del Atlántico - 28 December 2010 in La Masica, Atlántida

2011
 Hector Francisco Medina Polanco, Omega Visión, TV host - 10 May 2011 in Morazán, Yoro
 Luis Mendoza Cerrato, Channel 24, owner - 19 May 2011 in Danlí, El Paraíso
 Nery Geremias Orellana, Radio Joconguera - 14 July 2011 in Candelaria, Lempira
 Adán Benítez - 4 July 2011
 Medardo Flores - 8 September 2011
 Luz Marina Paz Villalobos, Radio CHN-Cadena Hondureña de Noticias, radio show host - 6 December 2011 in Tegucigalpa (capital), Francisco Morazán

2012
 Saira Fabiola Almendárez - 1 March 2012
 Fausto Evelio Hernández Arteaga, also called Fausto Elio Hernández - 11 March 2012
 Noel Alexander Valladares Escoto, Maya TV, TV presenter - 23 April 2012 in Tegucigalpa (capital), Francisco Morazán
 Erick Martínez Ávila, Kukulcán, public relations - Missing 5 May 2012 and found dead 7 May 2012 in Guasculile, north of the capital city
 Ángel Alfredo Villatoro, Radio HRN - Abducted 9 May 2012 & discovered dead on 15 May 2012 in Tegucigalpa (capital), Francisco Morazán
 Adonis Felipe Bueso Gutiérrez, Radio Stereo Naranja - 8 July 2012 in Villanueva, Cortés
 José Noel Canales Lagos, Hondudiario, online journalist - 10 August 2012 in Tegucigalpa (capital), Francisco Morazán

2013
Aníbal Barrow, anchorman for Globo TV, kidnapped by gunmen in San Pedro Sula - 26 June 2013. Found dead on 9 July 2013.
Juan Carlos Argeñal, Radio Globo correspondent, shot in his house - December 2013.

2014
Herlyn Espinal, journalist and reporter of Televicentro's newscast Hoy Mismo, disappeared on 19 July 2014, found dead on 21 July 2014.
Nery Soto, anchor of Canal 23, Olanchito, shot on 14 August 2014.
Reynaldo Paz Mayes, shot on 15 December 2014 near Comayagua.

See also 
 Human rights in Honduras
 List of journalists killed in Guatemala
 List of journalists killed in Mexico
 List of journalists killed in Venezuela

References

Honduras
 L
 L